Mary de Young is a retired professor of sociology formerly at Grand Valley State University, where from 2000 to 2003 she served as the head of the sociology department. She has published a variety of works in the area of child sexual abuse, including five books, several book chapters, and more than 35 peer-reviewed journal papers.

Scholarly works
In 1989, de Young reviewed the literature published by pro-pedophile organizations for public dissemination and found that pro-pedophile organizations used several strategies to promote goals of public acceptance of pedophilia, including the adoption of value-neutral terminology, redefining the term child sexual abuse, promoting the idea that children can consent to sex with adults, questioning the assumption of harm, promoting objective research, and the declassification of pedophilia as mental illness.

De Young has also published several works examining the satanic ritual abuse controversy as a moral panic from a sociological perspective.

Bibliography

Books

References

External links
 Home page at Grand Valley State University

American sociologists
American women sociologists
People from Grand Rapids, Michigan
Living people
Year of birth missing (living people)
Grand Valley State University faculty
Place of birth missing (living people)
Satanic ritual abuse hysteria in the United States